Hussein Jaber  is a former Iraqi football defender who played for Iraq in the 1964 Arab Nations Cup. He played for Iraq in 1964.

References

Iraqi footballers
Iraq international footballers
Association football defenders
Living people
Year of birth missing (living people)